Senator Kahn may refer to:

Jay Kahn (born 1950), New Hampshire State Senate
Roger Kahn (politician) (born 1945), Michigan State Senate